Gordon Hunter (born 3 May 1967) is a Scottish former footballer, who played as a defender for Hibernian, Canberra Cosmos, Dundee, Cowdenbeath, Hamilton Academical and Stirling Albion.

Hunter was part of the Hibernian team that won the 1991 Scottish League Cup Final (also playing on the losing side in the final of the same competition in 1985 and 1993); he was granted a testimonial match by the club in 1996 having made 409 appearances over 14 seasons. Hunter, who scored very few goals in his career, got the winner for Hibs in an Edinburgh derby match in 1994 that ended a record 22-game unbeaten run by Heart of Midlothian in the derby.

As of 2005, Hunter ran a taxi business in Edinburgh.

References 

Sources

External links 

Mass Hibsteria profile

1967 births
Living people
Footballers from East Lothian
Association football defenders
Scottish footballers
Canberra Cosmos FC players
Cowdenbeath F.C. players
Dundee F.C. players
Hamilton Academical F.C. players
Hibernian F.C. players
Stirling Albion F.C. players
Scottish Football League players
Scottish Premier League players
National Soccer League (Australia) players
Scotland under-21 international footballers
Scottish expatriate footballers
Expatriate soccer players in Australia
Scottish expatriate sportspeople in Australia